Athrips nigrogrisea is a moth of the family Gelechiidae. It is found in Russia (Buryatia).

The wingspan is 10–11 mm. The forewings are greyish black with black scales forming an oblique patch at the base of the wing and three indistinct dark spots in the middle and at about three-fourths near the posterior margin. The hindwings are light grey. Adults are on wing from early June to mid-July.

The larvae feed on Malus baccata and Malus domestica. Young larvae live between two leaves, connected by silk. Full-grown larvae feed on the leaves under a silken cover. Pupation takes place between dry leaves in leaf litter. The species overwinters in the pupal stage.

References

Moths described in 1958
Athrips
Moths of Asia